Switchwise.com.au was an electricity and gas price comparison service website for Australian consumers. The site enabled consumers to compare electricity and gas prices offered by 25 Australian energy suppliers. Consumers could switch their home energy supplier to a cheaper provider by completing an online application. People moving their homes could also arrange for cheaper electricity and gas connections through the site.

Access to the site was free to consumers. The company earned revenue by charging a commission to the supplier to which a customer chooses to switch or connect via the Switchwise website. The company also earned revenue from advertising across the site.

As of June 2019, the company's website indicated it was no longer operational. No reason was given.

History

Switchwise.com.au was established by Shaun Johnson in 2007 and the site was launched to the public in September 2008. The company was funded by Netus, an Australian technology investment group, which in turn was majority owned by News Limited. Switchwise also partnered with Serviceworks Management, a provider of services to the energy industry.

See also
 National Electricity Market

References

External links
 "How to Save on Your Power Bills", The Weekend Australian Financial Review, 30–31 January 2010. 
 "NSW Pays More for Power", The Sunday Telegraph, 8 August 2009. 
 "Customers face power bill slug", ABC News, 1 July 2009. 
 "Switchwise Electricity Comparisons Now Australia-Wide", LifeHacker, 23 June 2009. 
 "Queensland leads switch to green power", The Sydney Morning Herald, 1 March 2009. 
 "Price hikes to hail new year", The Age, 31 December 2008. 
 "Bill hikes to sour new year", The Courier, 30 December 2008. 

Comparison shopping websites
Online companies of Australia